The 2012 FIRS Intercontinental Cup was the thirteenth edition of the roller hockey tournament known as the Intercontinental Cup, played in November 13, 2012 at the Palacio de los Deportes de Riazor, in A Coruña, Spain. HC Liceo La Coruña (winner of the 2011–12 CERH European League) won the cup for a record fifth time, defeating Club Atlético Huracán (winner of the 2011 CSP South American Club Championship).

Match

See also
FIRS Intercontinental Cup

References

International roller hockey competitions hosted by Spain
2012 in Spanish sport
FIRS Intercontinental Cup
2012 in roller hockey